Nicolás Osvaldo Pisano Casco (born 17 September 1982) is an Argentine footballer.

External links
 
 Nicolás Pisano at Football-Lineups

1982 births
Living people
Argentine footballers
Argentine expatriate footballers
Serie C players
Argentinos Juniors footballers
Gimnasia y Esgrima de Jujuy footballers
Defensores de Belgrano footballers
Cienciano footballers
Cobresal footballers
Club Atlético Douglas Haig players
Expatriate footballers in Chile
Expatriate footballers in Peru
Expatriate footballers in Italy
Association football defenders
Footballers from Buenos Aires